John Reginald Hunter (born 25 October 1938) was a Welsh footballer. His regular position was as a forward. He was born in Colwyn Bay, Denbighshire (now Conwy). He played for Colwyn Bay, Manchester United, Wrexham and Bangor City

External links
MUFCInfo.com profile

1938 births
People from Colwyn Bay
Sportspeople from Conwy County Borough
Living people
Welsh footballers
Colwyn Bay F.C. players
Manchester United F.C. players
Wrexham A.F.C. players
Bangor City F.C. players
English Football League players
Association football forwards